Pramana – Journal of Physics, was launched in July 1973. Pramana (which in Sanskrit means “source of valid knowledge, a standard”) is the outcome of a nationwide effort by Indian physicists to disseminate their best efforts in physics. The journal is published by the Indian Academy of Sciences in collaboration with the Indian National Science Academy and the Indian Physics Association.

The journal presents refereed papers covering current research in physics, both original contributions---research papers, brief reports or rapid communications---and invited reviews. Pramana also publishes special issues devoted to advances in specific areas of Physics.

Pramana – Journal of Physics is now distributed in print outside India and online worldwide by Springer, co-publisher of the journal together with the Indian Academy of Sciences. On Springer, Pramana – Journal of Physics  is part of SpringerLink, one of the world's leading interactive databases of high quality STM journals, book series, books, reference works and online archives collection.

Pramana is published in e-only mode from Jan 2020 onwards. All content is freely available/downloadable without charge from the journal web page on the IASc website .

See also 
 Indian Journal of Physics
 Sādhanā

References

External links 
 

Physics journals
Publications established in 1973
English-language journals
Monthly journals